Aert Jansse van Nes (1626 – 13 or 14 September 1693) was a 17th-century Dutch naval commander, notable for commanding the second squadron in the raid on the Medway in 1667.

He was born at Rotterdam. Three modern ships of the Royal Netherlands Navy have been named after him - a destroyer in 1931, a frigate in 1966 and a multipurpose frigate (F833) in 1992.

References 

1626 births
1693 deaths
Military personnel from Rotterdam
Dutch naval personnel of the Anglo-Dutch Wars
Admirals of the navy of the Dutch Republic